Cerithioclava is a genus of sea snails, marine gastropod mollusks in the family Cerithiidae.

Species
Species within the genus Cerithioclava include:

 Cerithioclava garciai Houbrick, 1986

References

External links

Cerithiidae
Monotypic gastropod genera